Odostomia herilda is a species of sea snail, a marine gastropod mollusc in the family Pyramidellidae, the pyrams and their allies.

Description
The light-yellow shell has an elongate-conic shape. lts length measures 3.8 mm. The whorls of the protoconch are deeply obliquely
immersed in the first of the succeeding turns. The six whorls of the teleoconch are cylindric in outline, moderately rounded in the middle and very much
so at the very strongly shouldered summit. The sutures are well impressed. The periphery is short, the base of the body whorl is well rounded, the latter narrowly umbilicated. The entire surface of the spire and the base is marked by numerous vertical lines of growth and exceedingly fine, closely spaced, wavy spiral striations. The aperture is ovate. The posterior angle is obtuse. The outer lip is thin. The columella is slender, somewhat sinuous, slightly reflected, provided with a deep-seated fold a little anterior to its insertion;. The parietal wall is glazed with a thin callus.

Distribution
This species occurs in the Pacific Ocean off San Diego, California.

References

External links
 To World Register of Marine Species
 To ITIS

herilda
Gastropods described in 1909